The Strawberry River is a tributary of the Black River, about  long, in northern Arkansas in the United States.  Via the Black and White rivers, it is part of the watershed of the Mississippi River.

A minor headwater tributary of the Strawberry River is known as the Little Strawberry River.

See also
 List of Arkansas rivers

References

Rivers of Arkansas
Rivers of Fulton County, Arkansas
Bodies of water of Independence County, Arkansas
Bodies of water of Izard County, Arkansas
Bodies of water of Lawrence County, Arkansas
Bodies of water of Sharp County, Arkansas
Tributaries of the Black River (Arkansas–Missouri)